Siahuni (also Romanized as Sīāhūnī; also known as Sīāh Khūnī) is a village in Tula Rud Rural District, Central District, Talesh County, Gilan Province, Iran. At the 2006 census, its population was 356, in 97 families.

References 

Populated places in Talesh County